Olfactomedin 1, also known as noelin 1 or pancortin, is a protein that in humans is encoded by the OLFM1 gene. The name noelin stands for "neuronal olfactomedin-related endoplasmic reticulum-localized 1".

This gene product shares extensive sequence similarity with the rat neuronal olfactomedin-related ER localized protein. While the exact function of the encoded protein is not known, its abundant expression in brain suggests that it may have an essential role in nerve tissue. Several alternatively spliced transcripts encoding different isoforms have been found for this gene.

Cancer
OLFM1 gene has been detected progressively overexpressed in Human papillomavirus-positive neoplastic keratinocytes derived from uterine cervical preneoplastic lesions at different levels of malignancy. For this reason, this gene is likely to be associated with tumorigenesis and may be a potential prognostic marker for uterine cervical preneoplastic lesions progression.

References

Further reading

Olfactomedins